Mega City is a shopping mall located in Xinban Special District of Banqiao District, New Taipei, Taiwan that opened on January 5, 2012. The mall is a part of a joint development complex along with Far Eastern Mega Tower and both are owned and operated by the Far Eastern Group. Jointly designed by Benoy and Kisho Kurokawa, the mall started construction in 2008. Main core stores of the mall include Vieshow Cinemas, citysuper, Uniqlo, Gap, Nike and various other high end brands and themed restaurants. In January 2022, the fourth authorized Lego store in Taiwan opened in the mall.

Public Transportation
The mall is located in close proximity to Banqiao station, which is served by the Bannan line and Circular line of Taipei Metro as well as by Taiwan Railways and Taiwan High Speed Rail.

Gallery

See also
 List of tourist attractions in Taiwan
 Big City (shopping mall)
 Top City

References

External links

Mega City Shopping Mall Official Website

2012 establishments in Taiwan
Shopping malls in New Taipei
Shopping malls established in 2012